Sebastian Berhalter (born May 10, 2001) is an American professional soccer player who plays as a midfielder for Major League Soccer club Vancouver Whitecaps FC.

Early life and college
Born in London, England, Berhalter was raised in Columbus, Ohio. Between 2012 and 2013, he played youth soccer with Swedish club Hammarby IF when his father managed their senior team.

He joined the Columbus Crew youth academy in 2014, climbing the ranks and making 103 appearances and scoring 11 goals. In 2019, Berhalter played college soccer for the Tar Heels of the University of North Carolina, playing in 16 matches.

Career

Columbus Crew
Berhalter was announced as a homegrown player signing by the Columbus Crew of Major League Soccer on January 17, 2020. He made his professional debut on July 11, 2020, against FC Cincinnati during the MLS is Back Tournament in Orlando, Florida.

Austin FC (loan)
On March 3, 2021, Berhalter joined Major League Soccer club Austin FC on loan for the 2021 season. He made his debut for the club on April 24 against the Colorado Rapids, coming on as a substitute in the 3–1 away victory. Following the 2021 season, Berhalter's contract option was declined by Austin and he returned to Columbus.

Vancouver Whitecaps FC
On February 4, 2022, Berhalter was traded to Vancouver Whitecaps FC in exchange for $50,000 of General Allocation Money and a potential further $50,000 should certain conditions be met.

Career statistics

Club

Personal life
He is the son of former Columbus Crew and United States head coach Gregg Berhalter and former University of North Carolina Tar Heels player Rosalind "Roz" Santana.

Honors
Columbus Crew
MLS Cup: 2020

References

2001 births
Living people
Footballers from Greater London
Citizens of the United States through descent
American soccer players
North Carolina Tar Heels men's soccer players
United States men's youth international soccer players
Columbus Crew players
Austin FC players
Vancouver Whitecaps FC players
Major League Soccer players
Soccer players from Ohio
Homegrown Players (MLS)
Association football midfielders
MLS Next Pro players
Whitecaps FC 2 players